St Stephen-in-Brannel was an electoral division of Cornwall in the United Kingdom which returned one member to sit on Cornwall Council from 2013 to 2021. The last councillor was Mike McLening, a Conservative.

Extent
St Stephen-in-Brannel covered the villages of St Stephen-in-Brannel, Coombe, Lanjeth and Foxhole, and the hamlets of Carpalla, Hornick and High Street. The division covered 1,858 hectares in total.

Election results

2017 election

2013 election

References

Electoral divisions of Cornwall Council